The impeachment of Donald Trump may refer to:
 First impeachment of Donald Trump, the 2019 impeachment on charges of abuse of power and obstruction of Congress
 Impeachment inquiry against Donald Trump
 First impeachment trial of Donald Trump
 Second impeachment of Donald Trump, the 2021 impeachment on a charge of incitement of insurrection
 Second impeachment trial of Donald Trump

See also
Efforts to impeach Donald Trump
List of impeachment resolutions introduced against Donald Trump